John Schwartz (October 27, 1793 – June 20, 1860) was an Anti-Lecompton Democratic member of the United States House of Representatives from Pennsylvania from 1859 to 1860.

Biography
Schwartz was born in Northumberland County, Pennsylvania to Philip Schwartz and Maria Magdalena Schlosser, and was apprenticed to a merchant in Reading, Pennsylvania. He became a partner at the expiration of his apprenticeship.  Schwartz served in the War of 1812 as a major, and was engaged in the manufacture of iron products. His father, Philip, served in the Revolutionary War and was in Valley Forge

Schwartz was elected as an Anti-Lecompton Democrat to the Thirty-sixth Congress and served until his death in Washington, D.C. in 1860. He was interred in Charles Evans Cemetery in Reading, Pennsylvania. Cenotaph at Congressional Cemetery.

Personal life
He was married to Elizabeth Wood, daughter of Michael Wood.

See also

List of United States Congress members who died in office (1790–1899)

References

External links
 

1793 births
1860 deaths
Burials at Charles Evans Cemetery
Politicians from Reading, Pennsylvania
American military personnel of the War of 1812
Democratic Party members of the United States House of Representatives from Pennsylvania
Burials at the Congressional Cemetery
19th-century American politicians